Wagner Prado (born December 30, 1987) is a Brazilian mixed martial artist currently competing in the light heavyweight division of Absolute Championship Akhmat (ACA). A professional competitor since 2009, he has formerly competed for the UFC and KSW. He is ranked #10 in the ACA Light Heavyweight rankings.

Biography

Early life and MMA career
Prado started practicing Muay Thai at 19 years old and made his professional MMA debut in October 2009. At the same year he participated in the Brazilian television program Caldeirão do Huck of Rede Globo where he restored his Ford Maverick 1975 and earned his nickname. After his TV appearance, he joined Team Nogueira and achieved an undefeated record of 8-0, with 7 of his wins coming by way of knockout.

Ultimate Fighting Championship
Prado made his UFC debut against Phil Davis on August 4, 2012 at UFC on FOX 4, replacing an injured Chad Griggs.  An eye poke by Davis rendered Prado unable to continue at 1:28 of round 1 and the official result was a No Contest.

The rematch with Davis, briefly linked to UFC on FX 5, took place on October 13, 2012 at UFC 153. Prado received the first loss of his professional career to Davis in the second round via submission due to an anaconda choke.

Prado was expected to face Roger Hollett on January 19, 2013 at UFC on FX 7. However, Hollett was forced out of the bout with a torn bicep and was replaced by promotional newcomer Ildemar Alcântara. Prado lost via submission (kneebar) in the second round, and was subsequently released from the promotion.

Absolute Championship Berkut 
After going 8–3–1  since his UFC release, including a 2-0 stint in KSW, Prado signed with ACA, debuting against Elkhan Musaev at ACA 133 on December 4, 2021. He lost the bout via unanimous decision.

Prado faced Grigor Matevosyan on July 22, 2022 at ACA 141. He lost the bout via unanimous decision.

Championships and Accomplishments
Konfrontacja Sztuk Walki
Knockout of the Night (One time)

Max Fight
Max Fight Light Heavyweight Championship (One time)
One successful title defense

Mixed martial arts record

|-
|Loss
|align=center|16–7–1 (1)
|Grigor Matevosyan
|Decision (unanimous)
|ACA 141: Froes vs. Suleymanov
|
|align=center|3
|align=center|5:00
|Sochi, Russia
|
|-
|Loss
|align=center|16–6–1 (1)
|Elkhan Musaev
|Decision (unanimous)
|ACA 133: Bimarzaev vs. Lima
|
|align=center|3
|align=center|5:00
|Saint Petersburg, Russia
| 
|-
|Win
|align=center|16–5–1 (1)
|Mikhail Ragozin
|Decision (unanimous)
|Russian Cagefighting Championship 14
| 
|align=center|3
|align=center|5:00
|Ekaterinburg, Russia
|
|-
| Loss
| align=center|15–5–1 (1)
|Kirill Kornilov
|Decision (unanimous)
|Russian Cagefighting Championship 9
| 
|align=center|3
|align=center|5:00
|Ekaterinburg, Russia
|
|-
|Draw
|align=center|15–4–1 (1)
| Doo Hwan Kim
| Draw (unanimous)
| Battlefield Fighting Championship 2
| 
| align=center|3
| align=center|5:00
| Macau, China
|
|-
|Loss
|align=center|15–4 (1)
| Anton Vyazigin
| TKO (punches)
| Russian Cagefighting Championship 6
| 
| align=center|3
| align=center|3:17
| Chelyabinsk, Russia
|
|-
|Win
|align=center|15–3 (1)
| Łukasz Parobiec
| KO (punch)
| KSW 45: The Return To Wembley
| 
| align=center|1
| align=center|0:41
| London, England
|Heavyweight debut; Knockout of the Night.
|-->
|-
|Win
|align=center|14–3 (1)
| Chris Fields
| TKO (punches)
| KSW 44: The Game
| 
| align=center|2
| align=center|2:17
| Gdańsk, Poland
|
|-
|Win
|align=center|13–3 (1)
| Armando Sixel
|KO (knee)
|Katana Fight: Birthday Edition
|
|align=center|2
|align=center|3:52
|Colombo, Paraná, Brazil
|
|-
|Loss
|align=center|12–3 (1)
| Magomed Ankalaev
|KO (punches)
|WFCA 38: Grozny Battle
|
|align=center|1
|align=center|3:33
|Grozny, Russia
|For the AFC Light Heavyweight Championship.
|-
|Win
|align=center|12–2 (1)
| Aldo Silva
|TKO (punches)
|Max Fight 16
|
|align=center|1
|align=center|4:19
|São Paulo, Brazil
|Defended the Max Fight Light Heavyweight Championship.
|-
|Win
|align=center|11–2 (1)
| Cesar Fabiano Rodrigues
|TKO (punches)
|Max Fight 14
|
|align=center|1
|align=center|3:08
|São Paulo, Brazil
|Won the vacant Max Fight Light Heavyweight Championship.
|-
|Win
|align=center|10–2 (1)
|Johnny Walker
|TKO (punches)
|Circuito Team Nogueira Beach 1 
|
|align=center|2
|align=center|3:40
|Rio de Janeiro, Brazil
|
|-
|Win
|align=center|9–2 (1)
| Rafael Monteiro
|KO (punches)
|Iron Fight Combat 4
|
|align=center|2
|align=center|3:50
|São José dos Pinhais, Brazil
|
|-
|Loss
|align=center|8–2 (1)
| Ildemar Alcântara
|Submission (kneebar)
|UFC on FX: Belfort vs. Bisping
|
|align=center|2
|align=center|2:39
|São Paulo, Brazil
|
|-
|Loss
|align=center|8–1 (1)
| Phil Davis
|Submission (anaconda choke)
|UFC 153
|
|align=center|2
|align=center|4:29
|Rio de Janeiro, Brazil
|
|-
| NC
|align=center|8–0 (1)
| Phil Davis
|No Contest (accidental eye poke)
|UFC on Fox: Shogun vs. Vera
|
|align=center|1
|align=center|1:28
|Los Angeles, California, United States
|
|-
|Win
|align=center|8–0
| Aldo Sultão
|KO (punches)
|Max Fight 13
|
|align=center|1
|align=center|0:20
|São Paulo, Brazil
|
|-
|Win
|align=center|7–0
| Wellington Rodrigues
|TKO (punches)
|Max Fight 8
|
|align=center|1
|align=center|4:23
|Campinas, Brazil
|
|-
|Win
|align=center|6–0
| Cleber Tavares de Moura
|Decision (unanimous)
|X-Fight: Rio de Janeiro
|
|align=center|3
|align=center|5:00
|Rio de Janeiro, Brazil
|
|-
|Win
|align=center|5–0
| Fernando Tressino
|TKO (knees and punches)
|Campinas Fight 2
|
|align=center|1
|align=center|N/A
|Campinas, Brazil
|
|-
|Win
|align=center|4–0
| Luis Eduardo da Paixao
|TKO (punches)
|Max Fight 7: Rally Brazil
|
|align=center|3
|align=center|1:25
|Itatiba, Brazil
|
|-
|Win
|align=center|3–0
| Alexandre Imperador
|TKO (leg kick)
|First Class Fight 4
|
|align=center|1
|align=center|N/A
|Sao Paulo, Brazil
|
|-
|Win
|align=center|2–0
| Mario Dias
|KO (head kick)
|Ichigeki: Brazil 2009
|
|align=center|1
|align=center|1:02
|Bragança Paulista, Brazil
|
|-
|Win
|align=center|1–0
| Fernando Tressino
|KO (knees and punches)
|Ichigeki: Brazil 2009
|
|align=center|1
|align=center|0:35
|Bragança Paulista, Brazil
|

References

External links

1987 births
Living people
Brazilian male mixed martial artists
Brazilian Muay Thai practitioners
Brazilian practitioners of Brazilian jiu-jitsu
Sportspeople from Campinas
Ultimate Fighting Championship male fighters
Light heavyweight mixed martial artists
Heavyweight mixed martial artists
Mixed martial artists utilizing Muay Thai
Mixed martial artists utilizing Brazilian jiu-jitsu